María Soledad Diab Aguilar (born April 4, 1973) is an Ecuadorian model, television presenter, and politician of the Social Christian Party (PSC).

She served as a deputy of the National Congress in 2007, and has been a member of the National Assembly since May 14, 2021.

As a model, she was named Miss Ecuador 1992, and Miss Photogenic at Miss Universe 1992 in Bangkok, Thailand.

Early life and education
Soledad Diab was born in Guayaquil on April 4, 1973. She studied at the María Auxiliadora school in Guayaquil.

She married Richard Bohrer Pons in 1993, and they have three daughters.

Modeling and television

Diab joined Gamavisión to be a news anchor, but left after winning the Miss Ecuador 1992 pageant. She went on to compete at Miss Universe 1992 held in Bangkok, Thailand, where she was named Miss Photogenic.

Later, she joined Ecuavisa, where she was the host of the magazine Complicidades, and created the "People" segment on the Televistazo newscast.

Political career
In 1997, Diab was appointed Undersecretary of Tourism. She served as a provincial councilor of Guayas, and in 2007 she was a PSC candidate for the National Congress. She won a seat, but later that year, she was one of 57 deputies dismissed by the  due to the country's .

Before the 2021 general election, Diab presented her candidacy for the National Assembly for the same party. She won a seat, representing Guayas District 3.

In November 2021 she was one of the 81 politicians who abstained from voting which allowed the Economic Development and Fiscal Sustainability Law to be passed. Other abstainers included Jessica Castillo, Ana Herrera, Gissella Molina, Patricia Sánchez and Nathalie Viteri.

In September 2022 she resigned from position in the assembly for the Social Christian Party as she plans to stand to be a councilor in Guayaquil in the 2023 elections. This resignation is required by Ecuadorian law.

References

External links

 

1973 births
Living people
Members of the National Assembly (Ecuador)
Members of the National Congress (Ecuador)
Miss Ecuador
Miss Universe 1992 contestants
People from Guayaquil
Social Christian Party (Ecuador) politicians
Women members of the National Assembly (Ecuador)
21st-century Ecuadorian politicians
21st-century Ecuadorian women politicians